Walwick Grange is a privately owned 18th-century country house ( now a farmhouse) situated on the bank of the River North Tyne close to Hadrian's Wall at Warden, Northumberland. It is a Grade II* listed building.

Walwick was the seat of the Errington family from the mid 16th century. The three-storey five-bayed house was built, probably on the site of a medieval tower house, in the early 18th century.

William Errington of Walwick Grange was High Sheriff of Northumberland in 1739. His son John built a new house at Chesters (Humshaugh) in the 1770s.

Medieval fishponds nearby have Scheduled Ancient Monument status.

References
 English Heritage: Heritage Gateway, architectural description
 Keys to the Past

Grade II* listed buildings in Northumberland
Country houses in Northumberland